Stephen Gerald Breyer  (born August 15, 1938) is an American lawyer and jurist who served as an associate justice of the U.S. Supreme Court from 1994 until his retirement in 2022. He was nominated by President Bill Clinton, and replaced retiring justice Harry Blackmun. Ketanji Brown Jackson, who was nominated by President Joe Biden, was his designated successor. Breyer was generally associated with the liberal wing of the Court. He is now the Byrne Professor of Administrative Law and Process at Harvard Law School.

Born in San Francisco, Breyer attended Stanford University, the University of Oxford as a Marshall Scholar, and graduated from Harvard Law School in 1964. After a clerkship with Associate Justice Arthur Goldberg in 1964–65, Breyer was a law professor and lecturer at Harvard Law School from 1967 until 1980. He specialized in administrative law, writing textbooks that remain in use today. He held other prominent positions before being nominated to the Supreme Court, including special assistant to the United States Assistant Attorney General for Antitrust and assistant special prosecutor on the Watergate Special Prosecution Force in 1973. Breyer became a federal judge in 1980, when he was appointed to the U.S. Court of Appeals for the First Circuit. In his 2005 book Active Liberty, Breyer made his first attempt to systematically communicate his views on legal theory, arguing that the judiciary should seek to resolve issues in a manner that encourages popular participation in governmental decisions.

On January 27, 2022, Breyer and President Joe Biden announced Breyer's intention to retire from the Supreme Court. On February 25, 2022, Biden nominated Ketanji Brown Jackson, a judge on the U.S. Court of Appeals for the District of Columbia Circuit and one of Breyer's former law clerks, to succeed him. The Senate confirmed Jackson on April 7, 2022, by a vote of 53–47. Breyer remained on the Supreme Court until June 30, 2022. Breyer wrote majority opinions in landmark Supreme Court cases such as Mahanoy Area School District v. B.L. and Google v. Oracle and notable dissents questioning the constitutionality of the death penalty in cases such as Glossip v. Gross.

Early life and education
Breyer was born on August 15, 1938, in San Francisco, California, to Anne A. (née Roberts) and Irving Gerald Breyer. Breyer's paternal great-grandfather emigrated from Romania to the United States, settling in Cleveland, Ohio, where Breyer's grandfather was born. Breyer was raised in a middle-class Jewish family. His father was a lawyer who served as legal counsel to the San Francisco Board of Education. Breyer and his younger brother Charles R. Breyer, who later became a federal district judge, were active in the Boy Scouts of America and achieved the Eagle Scout rank. Breyer attended Lowell High School, where he was a member of the Lowell Forensic Society and debated regularly in high school tournaments, including against future California governor Jerry Brown and future Harvard Law School professor Laurence Tribe.

After graduating from high school in 1955, Breyer studied philosophy at Stanford University. He graduated in 1959 with a Bachelor of Arts degree with highest honors and membership in Phi Beta Kappa. Breyer was awarded a Marshall Scholarship, which he used to study philosophy, politics, and economics at Magdalen College, Oxford, receiving a first-class honors B.A. in 1961. He then returned to the United States to attend Harvard Law School, where he was an articles editor of the Harvard Law Review and graduated in 1964 with a Bachelor of Laws degree, magna cum laude.

Breyer spent eight years in the United States Army Reserve including six months on active duty in the Army Strategic Intelligence. He reached the rank of corporal and was honorably discharged in 1965.

In 1967, Breyer married The Honourable Joanna Freda Hare, a psychologist and member of the British aristocracy, younger daughter of John Hare, 1st Viscount Blakenham and granddaughter of Richard Hare, 4th Earl of Listowel. They have three adult children: Chloe, an Episcopal priest; Nell; and Michael.

Legal career
After law school, Breyer served as a law clerk to U.S. Supreme Court justice Arthur Goldberg from 1964 to 1965. He served briefly as a fact-checker for the Warren Commission, then spent two years in the U.S. Department of Justice's Antitrust Division as a special assistant to its Assistant Attorney General.

In 1967, Breyer returned to Harvard Law School as an assistant professor. He taught at Harvard Law until 1980, and held a joint appointment at Harvard Kennedy School from 1977 to 1980. At Harvard, Breyer was known as a leading expert on administrative law. While there, he wrote two highly influential books on deregulation: Breaking the Vicious Circle: Toward Effective Risk Regulation and Regulation and Its Reform. In 1970, Breyer wrote "The Uneasy Case for Copyright", one of the most widely cited skeptical examinations of copyright. Breyer was a visiting professor at the College of Law in Sydney, Australia, the University of Rome, and the Tulane University Law School.

While teaching at Harvard, Breyer took several leaves of absence to serve in the U.S. government. He served as an assistant special prosecutor on the Watergate Special Prosecution Force in 1973. Breyer was a special counsel to the U.S. Senate Committee on the Judiciary from 1974 to 1975 and served as chief counsel of the committee from 1979 to 1980. He worked closely with the chairman of the committee, Senator Edward M. Kennedy, to pass the Airline Deregulation Act that closed the Civil Aeronautics Board.

U.S. Court of Appeals (1980–1994)

He received his commission on December 10, 1980. From 1980 to 1994, Breyer was a judge on the U.S. Court of Appeals for the First Circuit; he was the court's Chief Judge from 1990 to 1994. One of his duties as chief judge was to oversee the design and construction of a new federal courthouse for Boston, beginning an avocational interest in architecture and the Pritzker Architecture Prize.

Breyer served as a member of the Judicial Conference of the United States between 1990 and 1994 and the United States Sentencing Commission between 1985 and 1989. On the sentencing commission he played a key role in reforming federal criminal sentencing procedures, producing the Federal Sentencing Guidelines, which were formulated to increase uniformity in sentencing.

Supreme Court (1994–2022) 

In 1993, President Bill Clinton considered him for the seat vacated by Byron White before ultimately appointing Ruth Bader Ginsburg. But after the retirement of Harry Blackmun, Clinton nominated Breyer as an associate justice of the Supreme Court on May 17, 1994. Breyer was confirmed by the Senate on July 29, 1994, by an 87 to 9 vote, and received his commission on August 3.

In 2015, Breyer broke a federal law that bans judges from hearing cases when they or their spouses or minor children have a financial interest in a company involved. His wife sold about $33,000 worth of stock in Johnson Controls a day after Breyer participated in the oral argument. This brought him back into compliance and he joined the majority in ruling in favor of the interests of a Johnson Controls subsidiary which was party to FERC v. Electric Power Supply Ass'n.

From the start of his tenure through the end of the 2019 term, Breyer wrote a total of 520 opinions, not counting opinions relating to orders or in the "shadow docket".

Abortion
In 2000, Breyer wrote the majority opinion in Stenberg v. Carhart, which struck down a Nebraska law banning partial-birth abortion. On June 29, 2020, he wrote the plurality opinion in June Medical Services v. Russo. The ruling struck down Louisiana's abortion law requiring any doctor who performed abortions to have admitting privileges at a hospital within 30 miles. Breyer reaffirmed the "benefits and burdens" test he had created in Whole Woman's Health v. Hellerstedt, which struck down a nearly identical abortion law in Texas. In 2022, he dissented in Dobbs v. Jackson Women's Health Organization, which overturned Roe v. Wade.

Census
In Department of Commerce v. New York (2019), Breyer was in the 5–4 majority that ruled that the Census Bureau had not followed proper procedure in its implementation of a citizenship question. He was also one of four justices who would have held the citizenship question unconstitutional in itself. In a mostly concurring opinion, he wrote: "Yet the decision was ill considered in a number of critically important respects. The Secretary did not give adequate consideration to issues that should have been central to his judgment, such as the high likelihood of an undercount, the low likelihood that a question would yield more accurate citizenship data, and the apparent lack of any need for more accurate citizenship data to begin with. The Secretary’s failures in considering those critical issues make his decision unreasonable".

On December 18, 2020, Breyer was one of three dissenters in Trump v. New York. In a 20-page dissent, he argued that the Court should not have sidestepped the case and should have ruled in favor of the challengers, who wanted the Court to block the Trump administration's last-minute attempts to exclude undocumented immigrants from the census. The census ultimately did not exclude undocumented immigrants, due to a lack of time and the subsequent issuance of Executive Order 13986.

Copyright
In Eldred v. Ashcroft, decided on January 15, 2003, Breyer and Justice John Paul Stevens filed separate dissenting opinions. In his 28-page dissent, Breyer argued that the 20-year retroactive extension of existing copyright granted by the Copyright Term Extension Act (CTEA) amounted effectively to a grant of perpetual copyright that violated the Copyright Clause of the Constitution, read in light of the First Amendment. He argued that the extension would produce a period of protection worth more than 99.8% of protection in perpetuity and that few artists would be more inclined to produce work knowing that their great-grandchildren would receive royalties. He also wrote that the fair use defense came to no avail either, as it could not help "those who wish to obtain from electronic databases material that is not there", e.g. teachers who can find from online no ideal material to be used in the class as it has been deleted. In 2012, he expressed a similar idea in his dissent in Golan v. Holder, which affirmed the constitutionality of the application of Section 514 of the Uruguay Round Agreements Act of 1994.

In 2005, while joining an unanimous Court in MGM Studios, Inc. v. Grokster, Ltd. against peer-to-peer file sharing companies Grokster and Streamcast on the ground of inducement liability, Breyer wrote a concurrence that the companies would be protected under the Sony doctrine without evidence of inducement. 

In American Broadcasting Cos., Inc. v. Aereo, Inc., decided on June 25, 2014, Breyer delivered the majority opinion, ruling that Aereo, allowing subscribers to view near-live streams of over-the-air television on Internet-connected devices, operated so overwhelmingly similar to the cable companies that it violated the right of public performance of the networks' copyrighted work.

In Google v. Oracle, decided on April 5, 2021, Breyer wrote the 38-page majority opinion, holding that Google's copying of 11,500 lines of Java declaring code (0.4% of all Java code) constituted fair use because "three of these packages were ... fundamental to being able to use the Java language at all". Breyer explained, "By using the same declaring code for those packages, programmers using the Android platform can rely on the method calls that they are already familiar with to call up particular tasks (e.g., determining which of two integers is the greater); but Google's own implementing programs carry out those tasks. Without that copying, programmers would need to learn an entirely new system to call up the same tasks."

Death penalty
In 2015, Breyer dissented in Glossip v. Gross, which held by a 5–4 vote that prisoners challenging their executions must provide a "known and available" execution method before challenging their method of execution. In a dissent joined by Ginsburg, Breyer questioned the constitutionality of the death penalty itself. He wrote, "For the reasons I have set forth in this opinion, I believe it highly likely that the death penalty violates the Eighth Amendment. At the very least, the Court should call for full briefing on the basic question." In July 2020, Breyer reiterated this position, writing, "As I have previously written, the solution may be for this Court to directly examine the question whether the death penalty violates the Constitution."

Environment
In Friends of the Earth, Inc. v. Laidlaw Environmental Services, Inc. (2000), Breyer was in the 7–2 majority that held that people who use the North Tyger River for recreational purposes but could not do so due to pollution had standing to sue industrial polluters.

On April 23, 2020, Breyer wrote the majority opinion in County of Maui v. Hawaii Wildlife Fund. The Court ruled that the County of Maui must have a permit under the Clean Water Act in order to release groundwater pollution into the ocean. Although the ruling was less broad than the 9th Circuit's ruling, environmentalist groups saw the ruling as a win and an affirmation of the Clean Water Act.

On July 31, 2020, Breyer dissented when the Supreme Court, in a 5–4 decision, refused to lift a stay on the 9th Circuit ruling that halted construction of the wall at the U.S.-Mexico border. The Sierra Club argued that the wall would harm the environment unduly, including threatening wildlife and changing the flow of water in the Sonoran Desert. Breyer wrote, "The Court’s decision to let construction continue nevertheless, I fear, may 'operat[e], in effect, as a final judgment.'" Ginsburg, Sotomayor, and Kagan joined his dissent.

On March 4, 2021, Breyer dissented in United States Fish and Wildlife Serv. v. Sierra Club, Inc., joined only by Sotomayor. The case concerned the Sierra Club's request under the Freedom of Information Act (FOIA) for "draft opinions" concerning rules governing underwater structures that are used to cool industrial equipment. The Sierra Club argued that it had the right to access the documents. The majority opinion limits environmental groups' ability to obtain government documents under FOIA. Breyer wrote in his dissent, "Agency practice shows that the Draft Biological Opinion, not the Final Biological Opinion, is the document that informs the EPA of the Services’ conclusions about jeopardy and alternatives and triggers within the EPA the process of deciding what to do about those conclusions. If a Final Biological Opinion is discoverable under FOIA, as all seem to agree it is, why would a Draft Biological Opinion, embodying the same Service conclusions (and leaving the EPA with the same four choices), not be?”

In Hollyfrontier Cheyenne Refining v. Renewable Fuels Association, Breyer ruled for oil refineries, joining the majority opinion, which held that oil refineries struggling financially did not need a continuous exemption every year since 2011 in order to be granted an exemption from federal renewable fuels policy.

Health care
Breyer generally voted to uphold the Affordable Care Act since its passage in 2010. He wrote the 7-2 majority opinion in California v. Texas, a decision on June 17, 2021, holding that Texas and other states lacked standing to sue against the Affordable Care Act's individual mandate. Breyer wrote, "It is consequently not surprising that the plaintiffs cannot point to cases that support them. To the contrary, our cases have consistently spoken of the need to assert an injury that is the result of a statute’s actual or threatened enforcement, whether today or in the future."

Partisan gerrymandering
On April 28, 2004, Breyer dissented in Vieth v. Jubelirer, in which the Court held that partisan gerrymandering is a non-justiciable claim. Breyer wrote in his dissent, "Sometimes purely political 'gerrymandering' will fail to advance any plausible democratic objective while simultaneously threatening serious democratic harm. And sometimes when that is so, courts can identify an equal protection violation and provide a remedy." In 2006, Breyer was in a 5–4 majority holding that District 23 of the 2003 Texas redistricting violated the Voting Rights Act due to vote dilution. Along with Justice John Paul Stevens, Breyer would also have ruled in favor of plaintiffs' claims that Texas's statewide plan was an unconstitutional partisan gerrymander. In June 2019, Breyer dissented in Rucho v. Common Cause, in which the Supreme Court decided 5–4 that gerrymandering is a non-justiciable claim.

Voting rights
Breyer wrote the majority opinion in Alabama Legislative Black Caucus v. Alabama, which ruled that racial gerrymandering claims must be looked at district by district, and struck down four of Alabama's state Senate districts as unconstitutional racial gerrymanders.

Breyer joined Ginsburg's dissent in Shelby County v. Holder. A 5–4 majority ruled that Section 4(b) of the Voting Rights Act is unconstitutional. Breyer joined another dissent by Ginsburg in RNC v. DNC, which overturned a lower court's extension of a voting deadline in the Wisconsin primary elections. The lower court had extended the deadline so that people who had not yet received mail-in ballots by April 7 could vote by mail in the wake of the COVID-19 pandemic. Breyer dissented in a similar Wisconsin case in October; the petitioners had asked the court to require Wisconsin to count mail-in ballots received up to six days after Election Day, and the Court, with Breyer, Sotomayor, and Kagan dissenting, refused the petitioners' request to extend the deadline. Breyer joined Kagan's dissent in Brnovich v. DNC (2021), a case that upheld Arizona's ban on ballot harvesting and refusal to count out-of-precinct ballots. As the most senior dissenter, Breyer likely assigned the dissenting opinion to Kagan.

Retirement 

After Democratic victories in the 2020 presidential and Senate elections, progressive activists and Democratic members of Congress called on Breyer to resign so that President Biden could nominate a younger liberal justice. In an August 2021 New York Times interview, Breyer said he wished to retire before his death, and recounted a conversation he had with Justice Antonin Scalia in which Scalia mentioned that he did not want his successor to "reverse everything I've done for the last 25 years". Breyer said that Scalia's point will "inevitably be in the psychology" of his decision to retire. In a September 2021 interview with Fox News'''s Chris Wallace, Breyer said activists calling for his resignation are "entitled to their opinion" and "I didn’t retire because I had decided on balance I wouldn’t retire". He said he took several factors into account when deciding his retirement plans, and reiterated that he did not plan to "die on the court".

On January 26, 2022, news outlets reported Breyer's intention to retire from the court at the end of the 2021–22 term. Breyer confirmed his pending retirement in a White House announcement alongside Biden on January 27. On February 25, Biden announced his nomination of Ketanji Brown Jackson, a former clerk of Breyer and judge of the United States Court of Appeals for the District of Columbia Circuit, to succeed Breyer on the Supreme Court. The U.S. Senate confirmed Jackson by a vote of 53-47 on April 7, 2022. Breyer retired on June 30, 2022, effective at 12:00 noon EDT, following the court's final opinions and orders for the term. Breyer's retirement left only one military veteran, Samuel Alito, on the Supreme Court.

Judicial philosophy
In general

Breyer's pragmatic approach to the law "will tend to make the law more sensible", according to Cass Sunstein, who added that Breyer's "attack on originalism is powerful and convincing".

Breyer consistently voted in favor of abortion rights,Stenberg v. Carhart, . one of the most controversial areas of the Supreme Court's docket. He also defended the Court's use of foreign law and international law as persuasive (but not binding) authority in its decisions. Breyer is also recognized as deferential to the interests of law enforcement and to legislative judgments in the Court's First Amendment rulings. He demonstrated a consistent pattern of deference to Congress, voting to overturn congressional legislation at a lower rate than any other Justice since 1994.

Breyer's extensive experience in administrative law is accompanied by his staunch defense of the Federal Sentencing Guidelines. He rejects the strict interpretation of the Sixth Amendment espoused by Justice Scalia that all facts necessary to criminal punishment must be submitted to a jury and proved beyond a reasonable doubt. In many other areas on the Court, too, Breyer's pragmatism was considered the intellectual counterweight to Scalia's textualist philosophy.

In describing his interpretive philosophy, Breyer has sometimes noted his use of six interpretive tools: text, history, tradition, precedent, the purpose of a statute, and the consequences of competing interpretations. He has noted that only the last two differentiate him from textualists such as Scalia. Breyer argues that these sources are necessary, however, and in the former case (purpose), can in fact provide greater objectivity in legal interpretation than looking merely at what is often ambiguous statutory text. With the latter (consequences), Breyer argues that considering the impact of legal interpretations is a further way of ensuring consistency with a law's intended purpose.

Active Liberty

Breyer expounded his judicial philosophy in 2005 in Active Liberty: Interpreting Our Democratic Constitution. In it, Breyer urges judges to interpret legal provisions (of the Constitution or of statutes) in light of the purpose of the text and how well the consequences of specific rulings fit those purposes. The book is considered a response to the 1997 book A Matter of Interpretation, in which Antonin Scalia emphasized adherence to the original meaning of the text alone.

In Active Liberty, Breyer argues that the Framers of the Constitution sought to establish a democratic government involving the maximum liberty for its citizens. Breyer refers to Isaiah Berlin’s Two Concepts of Liberty. The first Berlinian concept, being what most people understand by liberty, is "freedom from government coercion". Berlin termed this "negative liberty" and warned against its diminution; Breyer calls this "modern liberty". The second Berlinian concept—"positive liberty"—is the "freedom to participate in the government". In Breyer's terminology, this is the "active liberty" the judge should champion. Having established what "active liberty" is, and positing the primary importance (to the Framers) of this concept over the competing idea of "negative liberty", Breyer makes a predominantly utilitarian case for rulings that give effect to the democratic intentions of the Constitution.

The book's historical premises and practical prescriptions have been challenged. For example, according to Peter Berkowitz, the reason that "[t]he primarily democratic nature of the Constitution's governmental structure has not always seemed obvious", as Breyer puts it, is "because it's not true, at least in Breyer's sense, that the Constitution elevates active liberty above modern [negative] liberty". Breyer's position "demonstrates not fidelity to the Constitution", Berkowitz argues, "but rather a determination to rewrite the Constitution's priorities". Berkowitz suggests that Breyer is also inconsistent in failing to apply this standard to the issue of abortion, instead preferring decisions "that protect women's modern liberty, which remove controversial issues from democratic discourse". Failing to answer the textualist charge that the Living Documentarian judge is a law unto himself, Berkowitz argues that Active Liberty "suggests that when necessary, instead of choosing the consequence that serves what he regards as the Constitution's leading purpose, Breyer will determine the Constitution’s leading purpose on the basis of the consequence that he prefers to vindicate".

Against the last charge, Cass Sunstein has defended Breyer, noting that of the nine justices on the Rehnquist Court, Breyer had the highest percentage of votes to uphold acts of Congress and also to defer to the decision of the executive branch. However, according to Jeffrey Toobin in The New Yorker, "Breyer concedes that a judicial approach based on 'active liberty' will not yield solutions to every constitutional debate", and that, in Breyer's words, "respecting the democratic process does not mean you abdicate your role of enforcing the limits in the Constitution, whether in the Bill of Rights or in separation of powers."

To this point, and from a discussion at the New York Historical Society in March 2006, Breyer has noted that "democratic means" did not bring about an end to slavery, or the concept of "one man, one vote", and it is the concept of universal suffrage that allowed corrupt and discriminatory (but democratically inspired) state laws to be overturned in favor of civil rights.

Other books
In 2010, Breyer published a second book, Making Our Democracy Work: A Judge's View. In it, he argues that judges have six tools they can use to determine a legal provision's proper meaning: (1) its text; (2) its historical context; (3) precedent; (4) tradition; (5) its purpose; and (6) the consequences of potential interpretations. Textualists, like Scalia, only feel comfortable using the first four of these tools; while pragmatists, like Breyer, believe that "purpose" and "consequences" are particularly important interpretative tools.

Breyer cites several watershed moments in Supreme Court history to show why the consequences of a particular ruling should always be in a judge's mind. He notes that President Jackson ignored the Court's ruling in Worcester v. Georgia, which led to the Trail of Tears and severely weakened the Court's authority. He also cites the Dred Scott decision, an important precursor to the American Civil War. When the Court ignores the consequences of its decisions, Breyer argues, it can lead to devastating and destabilizing outcomes.

In 2015, Breyer released a third book, The Court and the World: American Law and the New Global Realities, examining the interplay between U.S. and international law and how the realities of a globalized world need to be considered in U.S. cases.

Other views
In an interview on Fox News Sunday on December 12, 2010, Breyer said that based on the values and the historical record, the Founding Fathers of the United States never intended guns to go unregulated and that history supports his and the other dissenters' views in District of Columbia v. Heller. He summarized:

In the wake of the controversy over Justice Samuel Alito's reaction to President Barack Obama's criticism of the Court's Citizens United v. FEC ruling in his 2010 State of the Union Address, Breyer said he would continue to attend the address:

Honors
Breyer was elected to the American Philosophical Society in 2004. In 2007, Breyer was honored with the Distinguished Eagle Scout Award by the Boy Scouts of America. In 2018, he was named to chair of the Pritzker Architecture Prize jury, succeeding previous chair Glenn Murcutt.

In popular culture
Breyer has appeared as a guest on Stephen Colbert's TV show. On the Late Show in September 2021, he discussed the Texas Heartbeat Act and his reluctance to retire.

Breyer appeared on Fareed Zakaria GPS on CNN in September 2021 where he was questioned on when he planned to retire. He promoted his book The Authority of the Court and the Peril of Politics.

 Publications 
 
 
 
 
 
 
 
 
 
 
 

See also

 Bill Clinton Supreme Court candidates
 Demographics of the Supreme Court of the United States
 List of justices of the Supreme Court of the United States
 List of law clerks of the Supreme Court of the United States (Seat 2)
 United States Supreme Court cases during the Rehnquist Court
 United States Supreme Court cases during the Roberts Court
 List of United States Supreme Court justices by time in office

References

Further reading

 

External links

 Stephen Breyer in Encyclopædia Britannica 
 
 Issue positions and quotes at OnTheIssues
 
 Review of Stephen Breyer's Active Liberty: Interpreting our Democratic Constitution
 "Stephen Breyer, the court's necromancer" , a book review of Active Liberty: Interpreting Our Democratic Constitution in the New English Review Active Liberty' from Justice Stephen Breyer", October 20, 2005, NPR's Fresh Air "Supreme Court Justice Breyer on 'Active Liberty Part 1 of Interview, September 29, 2005, NPR's Morning Edition "Justice Breyer: The Case Against 'Originalists Part 2 of Interview, September 30, 2005, NPR's Morning Edition Justice Breyer's appearance  on NPR's quiz show Wait Wait... Don't Tell Me'', March 24, 2007
  WGBH Forum Network: one and a half hours with US Supreme Court Justice of Law Stephen Breyer, September 8, 2003. Description (archived) | Video.
 
 
 Supreme Court Associate Justice Nomination Hearings on Stephen Gerald Breyer in July 1994United States Government Publishing Office

|-

|-

|-

1938 births
20th-century American judges
21st-century American judges
Alumni of Magdalen College, Oxford
American legal scholars
American people of Romanian-Jewish descent
Harvard Law School alumni
Harvard Law School faculty
Jewish American attorneys
Judges of the United States Court of Appeals for the First Circuit
Justices of the Supreme Court of the United States
Law clerks of the Supreme Court of the United States
Lawyers from San Francisco
Living people
Marshall Scholars
Members of the American Philosophical Society
Members of the United States Sentencing Commission
Military personnel from California
Recipients of the Legion of Honour
Scholars of administrative law
Stanford University alumni
Tulane University Law School faculty
United States Army non-commissioned officers
United States Army reservists
United States court of appeals judges appointed by Jimmy Carter
United States federal judges appointed by Bill Clinton